Villingili is an island in the North Male Atoll and is, administratively, known as Vilimalé and considered the fifth district of Malé City, Maldives. It lies about two kilometres (1.2 mi) west of Malé island and is reachable via local ferry service that operates 24 hours, between Malé and Villimalé.

Location within Malé City 
Villingili is to the west of Malé Island:

Early history
Villimale' used to be a resort earlier before it became a residential island. In fact it became the second resort to start operations in Maldives, after the first resort in Maldives, Kurumba became over-booked.

Between 2010 and 2016 an adolescent drug rehabilitation centre was operated near the public beach of Villimale'.

Tourism in Villimale'
Villimale' currently attracts a lot of local visitors and popular holiday destination among the residents of Male' and Hulhumale', specially during the weekends. There are several hotels and guest houses in Villimale' that also attract tourists from abroad.

Villimale' is also home to Liquid Water Sports, one of the few hydro sports hubs in Maldives. It actively promotes FlyBoarding and is a Zapata certified Professional FlyBoarding Partner.

Image gallery

References

Islands of the Maldives
Populated places in the Maldives